{{DISPLAYTITLE:C18H16O7}}
The molecular formula C18H16O7 (molar mass: 344.31 g/mol, exact mass: 344.0896 u) may refer to:

 Ayanin, a flavonol
 Cirsilineol, a flavone
 Eupatilin, a flavone and a drug
 Pachypodol, a flavonol
 Santin (molecule), a flavonol
 Scillavone A, a homoisoflavone
 Usnic acid, a naturally occurring dibenzofuran derivative found in several lichen species